Ronneby Airport (Kallinge)  is located about 4 km (2.5 mi) from Ronneby, Sweden and 30 km (17 mi) from Karlshamn and 30 km (17 mi) from Karlskrona.

Ronneby airport is south Sweden's (Götaland) 6th biggest airport and the 15th biggest airport in Sweden. The airport had 226,995 passengers in 2011.

Airlines and destinations

Statistics

See also 
List of the largest airports in the Nordic countries

References

External links

Airports in Sweden
Buildings and structures in Blekinge County